Christos Papanikolaou (born 25 November 1941) is a retired Greek pole vaulter. He competed at the 1964, 1968 and 1972 Olympics and finished in 18th, 4th and 11th place, respectively. He won a silver medal at the 1966 European Championships. He was a two-time champion at the Mediterranean Games. He was named the Greek Athlete of the Year, for the years 1965, 1966, 1967, and 1970.

Biography
At a young age Papanikolaou joined the Sports Club of Trikala. After completing his high school he enrolled to the Sports Academy of Athens. While in Athens, he joined Panathinaikos.

His greatest ever championship achievements only came when he won the silver medal at the 1966 European Championships and finished fourth at the 1968 Summer Olympics.

Papanikolaou trained in the United States at San Jose State College and was part of their 1969 NCAA Men's Outdoor Track and Field Championship team coached by Lloyd (Bud) Winter. At the 1970 Universiade in Turin, Papanikolaou finished second behind Wolfgang Nordwig, who won the event with a new world record of 5.46 metres. On 24 October the same year Papanikolaou jumped 5.49 metres in Athens to set a new world record. The vault was featured on the November 1970 cover of Track and Field News.  The record was later beaten by Swede Kjell Isaksson on 8 April 1972.

Papanikolaou was ranked by Track and Field News among the top ten pole vaulters a total of seven times between 1966 and 1972, more than any other Greek athlete. His highest position was second in 1970.

Achievements

References

External links
 Profile 

1941 births
Living people
Greek male pole vaulters
Olympic athletes of Greece
Track and field athletes from San Jose, California
Athletes (track and field) at the 1964 Summer Olympics
Athletes (track and field) at the 1968 Summer Olympics
Athletes (track and field) at the 1972 Summer Olympics
Panathinaikos A.O.
World record setters in athletics (track and field)
European Athletics Championships medalists
World record holders in masters athletics
Panathinaikos Athletics
Sportspeople from Trikala
San Jose State University alumni
Greek world record setters in athletics (track and field)
Universiade medalists in athletics (track and field)
Mediterranean Games gold medalists for Greece
Mediterranean Games medalists in athletics
Athletes (track and field) at the 1967 Mediterranean Games
Athletes (track and field) at the 1971 Mediterranean Games
Universiade silver medalists for Greece
Medalists at the 1970 Summer Universiade
20th-century Greek people
21st-century Greek people